Smugglers Beware is an Australian television series which screened on the ABC in 1963. It was one of the first scripted children's television series produced by the Children's Department at the ABC which also produced The Stranger.

Cast
 Paddy Conroy		
 Jack Allen		
 Brendon Lunney		
 Ruth Cracknell		
 Noel Brophy
 Nigel Lovell

See also 
 List of Australian television series

References

External links
 

Australian Broadcasting Corporation original programming
Australian drama television series
Australian children's television series
1965 Australian television series debuts
1963 Australian television series endings